New Line Home Entertainment (formerly known as New Line Home Video) was the home entertainment distribution arm of New Line Cinema, founded in 1990. According to New Line's website, Misery was the first New Line Home Video release.

It was responsible for the distribution of all New Line Cinema theatrical films for release on DVD and Blu-ray Disc.

The company also distributed some feature films from the specialty studio Picturehouse – formerly a New Line/HBO joint venture – as well as films or non-theatrical programs produced or acquired by New Line Home Entertainment and New Line Television.

In 2008, once its parent company became a unit of Warner Bros., New Line Home Entertainment was folded into Warner Home Video.

History 
In May 1991, New Line purchased the home video and foreign rights to films held by Nelson Entertainment (whose library included films inherited from Embassy Pictures) for $15 million, and thus obtained roughly 600 films. Shortly afterwards, New Line acquired the home video rights to the Nightmare on Elm Street franchise from Media Home Entertainment.

Before New Line formed its own video division, many of the company's films were released on video by various distributors. Initial offerings of New Line product came from Warner Home Video (for Gizmo!, Fighting Black Kings and Betty Boop for President), MGM/CBS Home Video (now MGM Home Entertainment) (for The Street Fighter and Return of the Street Fighter), Magnetic Video (for Leonor and Sympathy for the Devil, both through Viacom), Wizard Video (for Pink Flamingos, Female Trouble, Sister Street Fighter, and The Street Fighter's Last Revenge), and HBO/Cannon Video (formerly called Thorn EMI Video and Thorn EMI/HBO Video, later called as HBO Video, finally — HBO Home Entertainment) (for Xtro, The Evil Dead, The First Time, The Exterminators of the Year 3000, Warriors of the Wasteland, Stunts and Polyester). Later offerings came from RCA/Columbia Pictures Home Video and its successor, Columbia TriStar Home Video, Media Home Entertainment (for the first five Nightmare on Elm Street films, and The Hidden among others), and LIVE Entertainment (for Drop Dead Fred, Glengarry Glen Ross and the first Teenage Mutant Ninja Turtles film, through Family Home Entertainment). When New Line formed the video division, RCA/Columbia and Columbia TriStar distributed VHS releases, while Image Entertainment released the films on Laserdisc.

The New Line-Sony partnership stopped in early 1995, when Turner Broadcasting System bought New Line and from 1995 to 1996, New Line's video releases were distributed by Turner's video division. One New Line film the company merely distributed, The Swan Princess, was released solely on video on August 3, 1995, by Turner Home Entertainment.

After 1996, during the Time Warner ownership, New Line distributed their own films through New Line Home Entertainment underWarner Home Video. Their Blu-rays and DVDs not only featured advertisement for New Line, but also advertisement for its then sister studio Warner Bros., who advertised special releases from Warner Home Video. The same went for Warner Home Video's Blu-rays and DVDs; New Line Home Entertainment would advertise their special releases on Warner Home Video's Blu-rays and DVDs.

On January 5, 2008, New Line Cinema announced, as did Warner Bros., that it would exclusively support Blu-ray for their films and drop support of HD DVD. The only New Line Home Entertainment HD DVD ever released was Pan's Labyrinth.

New Line pursued a policy of regional lockout with its Blu-ray titles. This was in direct contrast to its corporate sibling Warner Home Video which left its Blu-ray titles region-free. With the studio being folded into Warner Bros., Warner has decided to discontinue this lockout policy with future titles.

In 2008, New Line Home Entertainment then folded into Warner Home Video after Warner Bros. acquired New Line. The company parted ways with Canadian film distributor Alliance Films. Warner Home Video, however, continued to use the NLHE logo for some time on Blu-ray and DVD releases of titles prior to Valentine's Day. But as of 2019, new releases of the said catalog use the Warner Bros. Home Entertainment logo.

See also 
 List of home video companies
 Infinifilm

References 

Home video companies of the United States
Entertainment companies based in California
Companies based in Los Angeles
Entertainment companies established in 1990
Mass media companies disestablished in 2010
1990 establishments in California
2010 disestablishments in California
New Line Cinema
American companies established in 1990